Boll KG is the personal production company of German filmmaker Uwe Boll. It is headquartered in Bergrheinfeld, Bavaria.

Films
 Blackwoods (2002)
 Heart of America (2002)
 House of the Dead (2003)
 Alone in the Dark (2005)
 Benazir Bhutto - Tochter der Macht (2005)
 The Cabin Movie (2005)
 BloodRayne (2006)
 In the Name of the King: A Dungeon Siege Tale (2007)
 Seed (2007)
 Postal (2007)
 BloodRayne II: Deliverance (2007)
 1968 Tunnel Rats (2008)
 Far Cry (2008)
 Black Men Can Swim (2008)
 Alone in the Dark II (2008)
 Rampage (2009)
 You're Rejected (2009)
 Sabotage 1943 (2009)
 Zombie Massacre (2010)
 Legend: Hand of God (2010)
 BloodRayne: The Third Reich (2011)

References

External links
 Official website 

Entertainment companies of Germany
Film production companies of Germany
Companies based in Bavaria